Ioannis Papstefanou was a Greek water polo player. He competed in the men's tournament at the 1948 Summer Olympics.

References

External links
  

Year of birth missing
Possibly living people
Greek male water polo players
Olympic water polo players of Greece
Water polo players at the 1948 Summer Olympics
Place of birth missing (living people)
Water polo players from Patras